Július Benčko (born 31 December 1976, in Roznava), also known as Juice, is a Slovak webdesigner, photographer, video artist. After closing down his webdesign company www.pixelhood.com (2001 - 2005) based in Slovakia, Július joined Kim Dotcom in 2006 as a Graphic Director of the Megaupload.com and other Mega-affiliated cyberlocker sites. He also obtained a 2.5% share in the Megaupload Ltd. holding company, held through Basemax International Ltd., where Benčko is the sole shareholder and appointed director.

Mega conspiracy
On January 5, 2012, Benčko was indicted by a grand jury in the Eastern District of Virginia, USA and charged with engaging in a racketeering conspiracy, conspiration to commit copyright infringement and money laundering along with Kim Dotcom and 5 other associates. While Dotcom, Finn Batato, Mathias Ortmann and Bram van der Kolk were arrested on January 20, 2012, in Auckland, New Zealand, by New Zealand authorities, Benčko and two others remain at large. Benčko faces a maximum penalty of 190 years in prison, if found guilty on all charges in the alleged Mega conspiracy.

Pixelhood

Since the shutdown of Megaupload by US authorities, Julius Bencko has restarted Pixelhood.com with a focus on video production, photography and other forms of digital art.

References

External links 
www.pixelhood.com
www.moritzdunkel.de

1976 births
Living people
Slovak artists